Cazenave may refer to:

Places 
 Cazenave-Serres-et-Allens, Ariège, France.

People 
 Pierre Louis Alphée Cazenave (1795–1877), French dermatologist
 Louis de Cazenave (1897–2008), French veteran of World War I
 Hector Cazenave (1914–1958), Uruguayan-French footballer
 Fernand Cazenave (1924–2005), French rugby union player and coach
 Anny Cazenave, French geodesist
 Laurent Cazenave (b. 1978), French auto racing driver
 Hector Horacio Casenave photojournalist, biker, sailor, diver, trekker (CP 1879) Bs.As. Argentina
 Gabriel Cazenave Paraguayan journalist
 Guillermo Cazenave (b. 1955), Argentinian composer, writer and journalist
 Noel Cazenave (b. 1948), American sociologist

Other 
 Cazenave, a common vine training system

Surnames of French origin
French-language surnames
Occitan-language surnames